József Borovnyák or Borovnják (1826 – 19 September 1909) was a Prekmurje Slovene writer, politician, and Roman Catholic priest in Hungary.

Borovnják was born in the village of Ivanócz (later Alsószentbenedek, Slovenian Ivanovci). His family was originally Protestant. His father converted to Catholicism.

Borovnják first served as a priest from 1851 to 1852 at the Istvánfalvian Church in the village of Apátistvánfalva (Vas Country).  He was later a priest in Felsőlendva and Cankova (where he died).

Borovnják was a defender of the local Prekmurje dialect. He wrote books in it; for example, a catechism and prayer books. In 1877 he posthumously reprinted Miklós Küzmics' Prekmurje dialect translation of the gospels. He was also involved in politics.

Works 
 Jezus moje poslenje (Jesus Is My Desire),
 Veliki katekizmus (Large Catechism)
 Kniga molitvena sztara szlovenszka (Old Slovene Prayer Book)
 Dühovna hrána (The House of the Soul)
 Máli politicsni vodnik (Little Political Mirror)
 Szvéti Angel Csuvár (Holy Guardian Angel)

See also
 List of Slovene writers and poets in Hungary

References
 Anton Trstenjak. Slovenci na Ogrskem (Hungarian Slovenes. Maribor 2006. 

1826 births
1909 deaths
People from the Municipality of Moravske Toplice
Slovenian writers and poets in Hungary
Slovenian writers
Slovenian politicians
People from the Municipality of Cankova